The Historic Derby Street Neighborhood, also known as the Derby Waterfront District in Salem, Massachusetts encompasses a historically significant portion of the waterfront area of the city.  It encompasses properties along Derby Street, which parallels the waterfront, eastward from the Salem Maritime National Historic Site to its junction with Fort Avenue, and includes properties on the side streets between Derby and the waterfront.  In addition to the National Historic Site, it includes the House of Seven Gables, a National Historic Landmark District.

The district features Federal architecture and was added to the National Register of Historic Places in 1976.

Gallery

See also
List of the oldest buildings in Massachusetts
List of the oldest buildings in the United States
List of historic houses in Massachusetts
National Register of Historic Places listings in Salem, Massachusetts
National Register of Historic Places listings in Essex County, Massachusetts

References

Historic districts in Essex County, Massachusetts
Salem, Massachusetts
National Register of Historic Places in Salem, Massachusetts
Historic districts on the National Register of Historic Places in Massachusetts